A clerk is someone who works in an office. A retail clerk works in a store.

Office holder
Clerk(s) may also refer to a person who holds an office, most commonly in a local unit of government, or a court.
Barristers' clerk, a manager and administrator in a set of barristers' chambers
Clerk (municipal official)
Court clerk
Clerk of the Supreme Court of the United States
Clerk of the Closet, held by a diocesan bishop
Deputy Clerk of the Closet, the Domestic Chaplain to the Sovereign of the United Kingdom
Patent clerk, or Patent examiner
Clerk (legislature)
Clerk of the Privy Council (Canada)
Clerk of the House of Commons, in the United Kingdom
Clerk of the Parliaments, in the United Kingdom
Clerk of the United States House of Representatives

Former titles
 Clerk of the Green Cloth, in the British Royal Household
 Clerk of the Peace, in England and Wales

Non-government titles
 Clerk (Quaker), an administrative role within the Religious Society of Friends
 Clerk (choral), an adult member of the choir at certain Colleges at Oxford and Cambridge Universities
 Clerk of works, in the UK, a tradesman who oversees a construction site

Films and related media
 Clerks (film), a 1994 American film by Kevin Smith
 Clerks II, 2006 American film sequel by Kevin Smith
 Clerks III, 2022 American film sequel by Kevin Smith
 Clerks (soundtrack)
 Clerks (comics), based on the film and published in the late 1990s by Oni Press
 Clerks: The Animated Series, a 2000–2002 American television series
 Clerk (1989 film), a Bollywood film starring Manoj Kumar
 Clerk (2021 film), a documentary film about the life and career of filmmaker Kevin Smith

Other uses
 Clerk (surname), derived from the occupation

See also
 Cleric (disambiguation), related word
"The Clerk's Tale", a story by Geoffrey Chaucer

Patronymic surnames
Scottish Gaelic-language surnames